Investcorp is a global manager of alternative investment products, for private and institutional clients. Founded in Bahrain in 1982, the firm has offices in United States, United Kingdom, Saudi Arabia, Qatar, United Arab Emirates, India, China, and Singapore. Its principal client base is in the six countries of the Gulf Cooperation Council, but it also has institutional clients in North America, Europe, and Asia.

The company's main activities involve private equity, real estate, and credit management. It typically places the private equity of companies and real estate properties it acquires directly with investors on a deal-by-deal basis and through a fund structure. In addition, the firm operates the Gulf Opportunity Fund investing in the MENA region, and a number of technology funds.

Investcorp currently has approximately $22.2 billion in invested assets under management across its four asset classes. In 2011, it ranked 67th in the PEI300 (Private Equity Index 300) ranking of private equity firms by assets deployed, with $4.68bn invested in private equity over the previous five years.

The company is regulated in Bahrain as a wholesale bank, and has traditionally utilised long-term and medium-term bank financing, including private placements and syndicated loans, in order to ensure a longer maturity profile. The company's capital adequacy ratio (Basel III) at 2017 December 30 was 29.8%.

History 
The company was co-founded in 1982 by Nemir Kirdar, Elias Hallak, Mike Merritt, and Cem Cesmig and acquired Tiffany & Co in 1984, floating in 1987. In 1988, Maurizio Gucci sold almost 47.8% of Gucci to Investcorp, and withheld the other 50% until 1993.

The company diversified in 1997 into hedge funds. Kirdar stepped down as CEO and executive chairman in 2015. With Kirdar resigning, Mohammad Alardhi became the executive chairmen of Investcorp. In the same year, the company's business model became more focused on raising funds, raising institutional capital, and diversifying strategies further.

Investcorp made several acquisitions between 2016 and 2019, pushing into China with investments into tech and the food sector. In 2019, the company also pushed into the US market with the acquisition of Mercury Capital. Investcorp's portfolio company, Moneybookers, ended its relationship with WikiLeaks in August 2010.

Investment areas

Corporate investment 
Corporate investment is Investcorp's traditional activity. This includes mid-size companies in North America, Western Europe and MENA including Turkey, as well as technology lower mid-cap investment, through Investcorp Technology Partners.

The past and present portfolio includes over 175 investments. Selected past investments include:
 Tiffany & Co. retailers of jewelry and luxury goods acquired 1984, floated 1987
 Gucci designer, producer and distributor of luxury accessories and apparel acquired from 1989 to 1993, floated 1996
 Leica Geosystems measuring instrument manufacturer acquired 1998, floated 2000
 Jostens US provider of school-related affinity products acquired 2000, sold 2003
 Neptune Technology Group US manufacturer of water meters acquired 2001, sold 2003
 MW Manufacturers a US maker of windows and patio doors acquired 2002, sold 2004
 Hilding Anders European mattress and bed manufacturer acquired 2003, sold 2006
 Apcoa European parking management providers acquired 2004, sold 2007
 American Tire Distributors the largest US independent tire distributor acquired in 2005, sold in 2010
 Moody International international provider of quality and safety services acquired 2007, sold 2011
 FleetPride North America's largest distributor of truck and trailer parts acquired 2006, sold 2012
 ProUnlimited United States-based software and services firm acquired in 2014 jointly by InvestCorp & Bahrain Mumtalakat Holding Company.
 Corneliani - Italian luxury brand in June 2016
 Ageras Denmark-based online marketplace for professional services acquired 2017
AviraGermany-based cybersecurity companyacquired 2020, sold to NortonLifeLock in 2021
Dainese - competitive motorcycling racing wear - acquired 2017
Vivaticket - Ticketing, access control and venue management - acquired 2019
Impero - EdTech company, online student safety provider - acquired 2017

Real estate investment 
The real estate division based in New York and London, sources and performs due diligence, and arranges financing and the acquisition of US and European properties and US commercial mortgage debt positions. The investment in these properties or loans is typically aggregated into a series of multi-investment portfolios for placement to clients. Debt investments are also made within a series of debt funds which are managed by the group. Since 1995, Investcorp has acquired in the region of 470 properties, totaling approximately $14 billion in value. It currently has more than $5 billion of property under management.

Hedge funds 
Investcorp's hedge fund business was established in 1996 and today has approximately $3.5 billion of capital under management, of which approximately $0.2 billion is reserved for proprietary investments.  The fund of funds program comprises a selection of funds of hedge funds with varying risk/return profiles. These are invested across different strategies through approximately 45 hedge fund managers.

In addition Investcorp has developed a single manager seeding platform, and currently offers, on a joint venture basis, access to six managers with specific strategies. The single manager platform currently has around $1.8 billion in client and proprietary assets under management.  In the last few years customised portfolios have grown as a proportion of the firm's overall hedge fund assets under management, with traditional fund-of-funds reducing.

16% of the hedge fund business is invested through fund of funds.  The remainder is invested through customized investments, seeding businesses and a single manager platform. The hedge fund business also provides institutional investors with access to its emerging manager program, investing with and seeding early stage managers who, according to Investcorp research, outperform larger hedge funds on a risk adjusted basis.

Credit management 
Investcorp Credit Management has assets under management of over $11 billion. Based in London, New York and Singapore, they manage funds which invest primarily in senior secured corporate debt issued by mid and large-cap corporates in Western Europe and the US.

References 

 https://www.hashmoder.com/s/JMHashim_Investcorp_TrueStoryBehindItsCreation_CompleteSet.pdf

1982 establishments in Bahrain
Financial services companies established in 1982
Real estate companies of Bahrain
Investment management companies of Bahrain
Companies listed on the Bahrain Bourse
Private equity firms of the Middle East
Companies based in Manama